Maamora is a town and commune in Bouïra Province, Algeria. According to the 1998 census it has a population of 3,569.

References

Communes of Bouïra Province
Cities in Algeria
Algeria